46th Avenue and Taraval (eastbound) and Taraval and 46th Avenue (westbound) are a pair of one-way light rail stops on the Muni Metro L Taraval line, located in the Parkside neighborhood of San Francisco, California.

Service 
Since August 2020, service along the route is temporarily being provided by buses to allow for the construction of improvements to the L Taraval line. The project is expected to wrap up in 2024.

History 

The station opened with the second section of the L Taraval line – an extension to 48th Avenue – on January 14, 1923. In 1937, a southern extension to Wawona and 46th Avenue was opened; the tracks west of 46th Avenue were then removed from revenue service, though they are still used for occasional vehicle storage, usually for accessible vehicles.

Reconstruction 
Like many stations on the line, Taraval and 46th Avenue had no platforms; trains stopped at marked poles before the cross street, and passengers crossed travel lanes on Taraval to board inbound trains. In March 2014, Muni released details of the proposed implementation of their Transit Effectiveness Project (later rebranded MuniForward), which included a variety of stop changes for the L Taraval line, but did not propose changes at 46th Avenue. On September 20, 2016, the SFMTA Board approved the L Taraval Rapid Project. Contrary to the original plan, a westbound boarding island will be built at 46th Avenue. 

Construction on the first phase of the project, between 33rd Avenue and 46th Avenue, began in September 2019. When Muni Metro service resumed on August 22, 2020, after a five-month closure during the COVID-19 pandemic, L Taraval service remained suspended west of Sunset Boulevard for construction. Rail service was re-replaced with buses on August 25 due to issues with malfunctioning overhead wire splices and the need to quarantine control center staff after a COVID-19 case. Construction of the westbound platform began on January 22, 2021. The first phase of the project, including the platform at 46th Avenue, was completed in July 2021.

References

External links 

SFMTA: 46th Avenue and Taraval, Taraval and 46th Avenue
SF Bay Transit (unofficial): 46th Avenue and Taraval, Taraval and 46th Avenue

Muni Metro stations
Railway stations in the United States opened in 1923